Batrić Jovanović is a Serb politician and author from Montenegro. He represented Montenegro in the Socialist Federal Republic of Yugoslavia parliament.

Books
Communist Party of Yugoslavija in Montenegro 1919-1941 1959
Montenegro in Second World War and Socialist Revolution 1960
Trinaestojulski ustanak 1984
Kolashin region in socialistic revolution 1985
Montenegrins about themself (Crnogorci o sebi) 1986
Negating serb origins of montenegrins is crime of Tito and Stalin (Rasrbljivanje Crnogoraca: Staljinov i Titov zlocin) 2003

References

External links
http://www.glas-javnosti.rs/clanak/glas-javnosti-16-01-2008/batric-jovanovic-posledice-antisrpske-politike-tri-decenije-kasnije-

Living people
Montenegrin politicians
Serbian writers
Place of birth missing (living people)
Serbs of Montenegro
Year of birth missing (living people)